Maa Tujhe Salaam is a 2018 Indian Bhojpuri-language romance film directed by Aslam Sheikh and produced by Abhay Sinha & Samir Aftab. Pawan Singh is in lead role and Madhu Sharma and Akashra Singh in his opposite. While Surendra Pal, Prakash Jais, Sameer Aftab, Ayaz Khan, Manoj Tiger, Brijesh Tripathi and others in supporting roles.

Cast
 Pawan Singh as Bajrang Ali Khan (Bajrangi)
 Madhu Sharma as Pooja/Ayat Khan
 Surendra Pal as Abhay Pratap Singh
 Akshara Singh as  Geeta
 Sameer Aftab as  Aftab Khan (Pakishtani Police )
 Ayaz  Khan as  Yasir Khan (Terrorist)
Prakash Jais as  Lucky Tiger/Lahori Tiger
Manoj Tiger as Parwana Karimullah
Brijesh Tripathi as Indian Raw Officer

Soundtrack

The soundtrack for "Maa Tujhe Salaam" was composed by Avinash Jha (Ghunghroo) with lyrics penned by Manoj matlabi, Ashok Kumar Deep, Ajit Mandal, Munna Dubey & Sujit Singh Chandrawanshi. It was produced under the "Yashi Films" label. The soundtrack included an unusually number of songs at 6. Her song "Bhagwan Badi Fursat Se" sung by Pawan Singh and Khushboo Jain released on 3 October 2018 on YouTube and he get 5 million views till now. All songs of this film are available on YouTube official channel of "Yashi Music" and all are superhit.

Marketing and release
On 1 July 2018, Pawan Singh shared a poster of this film on his Instagram official handle.

Trailer of this film was released on 13 July 2018 at official YouTube channel of "Yashi Films". he got 11 millions views till now.

The film was released on 10 August 2018 in Bihar, Jharkhand & Nepal theatres. On 17 August 2018 the film was released in Mumbai & Gujarat theatres. He get biggest opening of 2018 and hit at the Box Office.

Award and nominations

References

2018 films
2010s Bhojpuri-language films